Dave Lowry is an American writer best known for his articles, manuals and novels based on Japanese martial arts.

A student of Japanese martial arts since 1968, when he began studying Yagyū Shinkage-ryū kenjutsu under Ryokichi Kotaro of the Nara Prefecture of Japan, he has also studied Shintō Musō-ryū, as well as  karate, aikido, and Kodokan judo.

He has a degree in English, and has written about a variety of topics related to budō, the Japanese concept of the "martial way." He has written training manuals on use of weapons such as the bokken and jo, a few novels centered on the lifestyle of the budōka (one who follows the martial way), and many articles on martial practices and traditional Japanese philosophy. He has been a regular columnist for Black Belt magazine since 1986, where he writes on the traditional arts.

He has written almost 20 books, primarily on the martial arts.

He has also held positions as a published restaurant critic.

Published works

 The Connoisseurs Guide to Sushi
 Clouds in the West: Lessons from the Martial Arts of Japan
 Moving Toward Stillness: Lessons in Daily Life from the Martial Ways of Japan
 Traditions: Essays on the Japanese Martial Arts and Ways
 Autumn Lightning: The Education of an American Samurai
 Persimmon Wind: A Martial Artist's Journey in Japan
 Jo: The Art Of The Japanese Short Staff
 Sword and Brush: The Spirit of the Martial Arts
 Bokken - Art of the Japanese Sword
 In the Dojo: A Guide to the Rituals and Etiquette of the Japanese Martial Arts
 The Karate Way: Discovering the Spirit of Practice
 The Essence of Budo: A Practitioner's Guide to Understanding the Japanese Martial Ways
 Chinese cooking for diamond thieves (novel)

References 

Year of birth missing (living people)
Living people
American martial arts writers
American restaurant critics
American male non-fiction writers